Mozilla localizations are localized versions of Mozilla products. This usually entails that a product has been both translated into a certain language and that language and region specific features have been added. 

Localization is normally carried out by teams of volunteers.

Mozilla Firefox
Mozilla Firefox is the most heavily localized cross-platform web browser to date. The first official release in November 2004 was available for 28 different locales including British English/American English, European Spanish/Argentine Spanish and Chinese in Traditional Chinese characters/Simplified Chinese characters. Firefox 4 initially shipped with over 80 locales and introduced 10 new locales, including 6 African languages.

The following table lists releases of Firefox and its precursors for the Microsoft Windows operating system, listing all locales available at the end of each version's releases.

Mozilla Thunderbird
Mozilla Thunderbird, the email application, has somewhat fewer localised releases. The initial release was in US English only but since then, it has been released in 45 languages and for 47 locales.

Mozilla Firefox OS

Web content and legal info
Though much of the Mozilla web content can be localized, the extent of localization varies from locale to locale. For example, the Mozilla Firefox Privacy Policy is currently only available in English.

See also

History of Firefox
List of web browsers
Timeline of web browsers

References

External links 

Mozilla Localization
Mozilla Localization Blog
Planet Mozilla Localization
Mozilla Localization Teams
Mozilla Firefox homepage for end-users
Firefox Nightly Builds
Mozilla Foundation homepage

Firefox
Free multilingual software
History of the Internet
MacOS web browsers
Windows web browsers